Naïve Art is the debut album by British-American synthpop band Red Flag, released in 1989.

Track listing
 "If I Ever"  (4:45)
 "Pretty in Pity"  (4:15)
 "Russian Radio"  (6:12)
 "Give Me Your Hand"  (5:03)
 "All Roads Lead to You"  (6:51)
 "Count to Three"  (4:06)
 "Save Me Tonight"  (5:04)
 "Broken Heart"  (4:04)
 "I Don't Know Why"  (5:55)
 "Rain"  (6:09)
 "Fur Michelle"  (2:25)
 "If I Ever" (Extended Remix) (6:33)*
 "Russian Radio" (Razormaid Dub) (6:48)*
 "Broken Heart" (Tra Graham Dub) (6:07)*
 "Rain" (Remix) (5:12)*

Recorded at Platinum Island Studios, NYC.

Notes
 - The artwork incorrectly lists track 12 as "Russian Radio (Razormaid Dub)" and track 13 as "If I Ever (Extended Remix)". Tracks 14 and 15 are not listed as in other versions of this release.

Special edition

Naïve Art - Special Edition is a special release of the album Naïve Art, which included new tracks and remixes.

Track listing
 "If I Ever" (4:45)
 "Pretty in Pity" (4:14)
 "Russian Radio" (6:11)
 "Give Me Your Hand" (5:02)
 "All Roads Lead to You" (6:50)
 "Count to Three" (4:05)
 "Save Me Tonight" (5:03)
 "Broken Heart" (4:02)
 "I Don't Know Why" (5:51)
 "Rain" (6:08)
 "Fur Michelle" (2:23)
 "Russian Radio (Razormaid Dub)" (5:23)
 "If I Ever (Extended Remix)" (5:05)
 "Black Rose" (3:49)
 "Lovers Unite" (4:49)
 "Russian Radio (Seibold Mix)" (5:16)
 "Russian Radio (Decade Mix)" (4:55)

Notes
 - Indicated tracks appear on CD only (1989 Enigma Records, CD/vinyl/cassette). Re-released on Restless Records (1994). CD and vinyl contain different mixes of some songs.

30th Anniversary Expanded Edition

Naïve Art - 30th Anniversary Edition is a special release of the album Naïve Art, which included remastered tracks and remixes. Vinyl version was released on March 9, 2020.
Some tracks appears on CD for the first time.

Track listing
Disc 01
 "If I Ever" (4:45)
 Pretty In Pity [4:15]
 Russian Radio [6:13]
 Give Me Your Hand [5:03]
 All Roads Lead To You [6:52]
 Count To Three [4:06]
 Save Me Tonight [5:04]
 Broken Heart [4:04]
 I Don't Know Why [5:56]
 Rain [6:10]
 Fur Michelle [2:26]
 Broken Heart (Radio Edit) (3:57)
 Control (5:31)
 Black Rose (3:49)
 Lovers Unite (4:51)
 Rain (Remix) (5:12)

Disc 02
 Russian Radio (Glasnost Club Mix) (7:30)
 Broken Heart (UK Remix) (5:19)
 If I Ever (Dance Mix) (6:32)
 Count To Three (Razormaid Remix) (6:51)
 Give Me Your Hand (Razormaid Remix) (6:55)
 Broken Heart (Extended Remix) (5:40)
 Russian Radio (Razormaid Dub) (6:47)
 Count To Three (House Mix) (7:31)
 If I Ever (The 1000 Years Mix) (6:40)
 Russian Radio (Tremont & Webster Mix) (4:41)
 Pretty In Pity (Painless Mix) (4:35)
 Broken Heart (Remix) (6:03)
 Russian Radio (Radio Moscow Edit) (3:45)

Notes
 - Indicated tracks appear on CD only. Also released on vinyl in standart black and red or white translucent.

References

 Synthpop.NET Review

1989 debut albums
Red Flag (band) albums
Enigma Records albums